Rose Luise Maria Stradner (July 31, 1913 – September 27, 1958) was an Austrian stage and film actress, who starred opposite Edward G. Robinson, James Stewart, Gregory Peck, and other leading men of her era. She was married to the film director Joseph L. Mankiewicz.

Life and career
Stradner was born in Vienna, Austria on July 31, 1913. While still an infant, she moved with her parents to Trieste and Isonzo, where her father was stationed as an engineer in charge of troop transportation during World War I. Post-war, she was sent to a convent after returning with her parents to Vienna. After completing her education, during which she learned English, performed in student plays and became an accomplished pianist, she became a pupil of Austrian theatrical producer and film director Max Reinhardt. Trained by him, she was subsequently hired by a Hollywood studio after executives saw photographs of her.

With Reinhardt's guidance, she made her stage debut in 1937.

In 1937, she made her Hollywood film debut opposite Edward G. Robinson and James Stewart in The Last Gangster, in which she played the wife of Robinson's character, Joe Krozac. Washington's Evening Star said of her, in an image caption in its November 10 edition that same year: "Rose Stradner is being hailed by the M-G-M people as the studio's greatest discovery since Garbo, as they seem to feel she is going places in the cinema."

Announcing in 1939 that she had signed a long-term contract with Columbia Pictures, Washington's Evening Star called her "one of the great dramatic stars of the European stage", adding that as "a prominent member of the Max Reinhardt school of the theater, "Miss Stradner has appeared in more than 50 dramas, ranging from Shakespeare, Ibsen and Moliere to noted modern day playwrights [including] .... 'Dinner at Eight,' 'An American Tragedy,' ... 'Faust,' 'Cymbeline,' 'As You Like It,' 'Romeo and Juliet,' 'Hamlet,' 'St. Joan,' and others."

She married writer/director Joseph L. Mankiewicz, younger brother of writer Herman Mankiewicz, in 1939.

Her final movie role was starring opposite Gregory Peck in 1944's The Keys of the Kingdom.

Death
On September 27, 1958, Stradner committed suicide at her summer home in Mount Kisco, New York by overdosing on sleeping pills. She was 45 years old. According to Rochester's Democrat and Chronicle:

Police said a nearly indecipherable note was found in her hand.... A caretaker found the body lying on the floor next to a writing table. Police listed the death tentatively as natural pending an autopsy. Mankiewicz, also a writer and director, said he had last seen his wife Friday night [September 26] when he left [their home] for New York to work on a forthcoming Broadway play. She appeared in good spirits at the time, he added. Miss Stradner wed the film executive in 1939.

She was laid to rest at the Kensico Cemetery in Valhalla.

Selected filmography
 Wedding at Lake Wolfgang (1933)
 So Ended a Great Love (1934)
 A Night of Change (1935)
 Hundred Days (1935)
 Dinner Is Served (1936)
 City of Anatol (1936)
 The Postman from Longjumeau (1936)
 The Last Gangster (1937)
 Blind Alley (1939)
 The Keys of the Kingdom (1944)

References

Bibliography
 Barton, Ruth. Hedy Lamarr: The Most Beautiful Woman in Film. University Press of Kentucky, 2010.
 Eyman, Scott. Lion Of Hollywood: The Life And Legend Of Louis B. Mayer. Simon and Schuster, 2005.

External links

1913 births
1958 suicides
Austrian film actresses
Actresses from Vienna
20th-century Austrian actresses
Drug-related suicides in New York (state)
Mankiewicz family
Austrian emigrants to the United States
Burials at Kensico Cemetery